George Nicholas Mehnert (November 3, 1881 – July 8, 1948) was an American wrestler who competed in the 1904 Summer Olympics and 1908 Summer Olympics. He was born in Newark, New Jersey.

At the 1904 Olympics, he won a gold medal in flyweight category. Four years later at the 1908 Olympics, he won a gold medal in freestyle bantamweight category. By winning the gold medal in 1908, Mehnert became the first American to win two Olympic gold medals in wrestling.

In 1976, Mehnert was inducted into the inaugural class of the National Wrestling Hall of Fame as a Distinguished Member.

References

External links
 

1881 births
1948 deaths
American male sport wrestlers
Olympic gold medalists for the United States in wrestling
Medalists at the 1908 Summer Olympics
Medalists at the 1904 Summer Olympics
Sportspeople from Newark, New Jersey
Wrestlers at the 1904 Summer Olympics
Wrestlers at the 1908 Summer Olympics